Aureisphaera salina is a Gram-negative, aerobic, chemoheterotrophic, rod-shaped and non-motile bacterium from the genus of Aureisphaera which has been isolated from an ascidian from the Kohama Island.

References 

Flavobacteria
Bacteria described in 2016